Jan Koller (born 11 August 1901, date of death unknown) was a Czech sports shooter. He competed in the 50 m pistol event at the 1936 Summer Olympics.

References

1901 births
Year of death missing
Czech male sport shooters
Olympic shooters of Czechoslovakia
Shooters at the 1936 Summer Olympics
Place of birth missing